The thornback cowfish (Lactoria fornasini), is a poisonous species of boxfish found throughout the tropical Indo-Pacific from East Africa to the Bass Islands (French Polynesia). It is an uncommon fish that feeds on small invertebrates that it picks up off the sea bed.

The specific epithet fornasini is in honour of Italian amateur naturalist Carlo Antonio Fornasini, who worked in Mozambique.

Description
Like other members of the family Ostraciidae, the thornback cowfish has hexagonal, plate-like scales which are fused together to form a solid, box-like carapace, from which the eyes, mouth, fins and tail protrude. The mouth is small and has protruding lips, the upper profile of the snout is straight, the back is somewhat convex, the flanks are concave and the belly rounded, causing the fish to resemble a purse. There are small pre-ocular spines on either side of the head, a large spine projects from the dorsal ridge and a further moderate-sized spine projects from each of the pelvic ridges near the anal fin. Neither the dorsal fin nor the anal fin has any spines but both have nine soft rays, while the caudal fin is fan-shaped and has ten rays. In some regions, this fish is toxic.

Distribution and habitat
The thornback cowfish is native to the tropical Indo-Pacific region between 32°N and 32°S. Its range extends from the east coast of Africa between Tanzania and South Africa and the island of Madagascar, to Japan, Indonesia, Australia, Hawaii and Rapa Island. It occurs in areas of sand, rubble, corals and algae both in lagoons and on the seaward side of reefs.

Ecology
This fish is usually solitary but the males are territorial in the breeding season. The diet consists of small invertebrates, which are exposed by jets of water from the mouth blowing away sand, and picked up by suction from the sea bed. It is an uncommon species.

References

External links
 

Ostraciidae
Taxa named by Giovanni Giuseppe Bianconi
Fish described in 1846